Kalateh Shah Mir (also Romanized as Kalāteh Shāh Mīr and Kalāteh-ye Shāhmīr) is a village in Faruj Rural District, in the Central District of Faruj County, North Khorasan Province, Iran. At the 2006 census, its population was 45, in 9 families.

References 

Populated places in Faruj County